Sadler House may refer to:

in the United States (by state then city)
Sadler House (McCalla, Alabama), listed on the National Register of Historic Places (NRHP) in Jefferson County]]
Terrell-Sadler House, Harmony, Georgia, listed on the NRHP in Putnam County
Herbert A. Sadler House, Attleboro, Massachusetts, listed on the NRHP in Bristol County
Sadler House (Aberdeen, Mississippi), listed on the NRHP in Monroe County
Gov. Reinhold Sadler House, Carson City, Nevada, listed on the NRHP in Carson City
Sadler House (Montclair, New Jersey), listed on the NRHP in Essex County, New Jersey
Samuel Sadler House, Sandy Creek, New York, listed on the NRHP in Oswego County